Paulino Uzcudun Eizmendi (3 May 1899 – 5 July 1985) was a Spanish heavyweight boxer, who is considered to be the greatest heavyweight from Spain. Uzkudun is the Basque spelling of his last name. He was the youngest of nine siblings. In his youth, he became an aizkolari or traditional competitive Basque wood chopper. Uzcudun, known as Paulino in the United States, was the European heavyweight champion, and he fought heavyweight champions Joe Louis, Max Baer, Max Schmeling (three times) and Primo Carnera (twice) during his career. The former butcher—nicknamed "the Basque woodchopper"—retired from boxing with a record of 49 wins (33 KOs), 17 losses and 3 draws.

Uzcudun was a rugged boxer with a crouched stance. He had a powerful left hook, and fought the toughest heavyweights of his time. He had only one opportunity at the world's heavyweight championship, but was defeated in a fifteen-round fight by Primo Carnera of Italy on October 22, 1933. Trainer Whitey Bimstein accompanied Uzcudun to the bout in Barcelona, Spain. Later in life, Bimstein gave an account in interview, of a scene more reminiscent of the cinema: "I remember one day we were at a sidewalk cafe. Just as I started to put my lips to a glass of vermouth a shot splintered the glass. Believe me, I got back to the hotel in nothing flat..." Much more grim was his description of the Civil War in Spain beyond such high drama: "It was nothing to walk along the streets covered with hundreds of dead, and you couldn't tell when the fighting would break out anew." Against this chaotic backdrop, Uzcudun's chance at the title took place.

Shortly before the fight, Carnera balked at the Spanish-made gloves chosen by the governing boxing commission. The champion, who had insisted upon American gloves, stated loudly and in Spanish that he would not fight. The commissioner, according to Bimstein, removed himself from the room, and "about a dozen soldiers walked toward Carnera." The champion "backed up hurriedly" and conceded the choice.  As for the actual fight, Uzcudun went the 15 scheduled rounds and well enough, that "when the verdict was announced, the revolution started all over again." A riot, which included gunfire, commenced. Uzcudun, Bimstein, the other seconds and as many as "three hundred others" took refuge under the massive ring, until troops restored order—even with this, citizenry "continued rioting in the streets all night...." It was unfortunate for Uzcudun, whom Bimstein said "was the finest character among the fighters I ever met, square as they make 'em, game and tough, and in his prime a match for any of 'em."

Uzcudun also "retired" the famed Harry Wills, when he stopped him in four rounds on July 13, 1927. The tough and durable Uzcudun was never knocked off his feet, or KO'd until his last professional fight. On December 13, 1935, Uzcudun made the mistake of coming out of retirement to meet Joe Louis. In the fourth round, Louis hit Uzcudun with a swift, powerful right uppercut that knocked him down causing the referee to stop the fight even though Uzcudun wanted to continue. His record was 49–17–3 with 33 knockouts.

In 1933–34, Uzcudun trained on the beach in Rocky Point, Long Island, New York. During a sparring session with Franklin Rosalia (1911–1972), who also summered in Rocky Point, Uzcudun received a punch that knocked him down flat. Some conjecture that this incident led to his subsequent retirement having been demoralized by this incident. In 1936, Uzcudun fought on the Nationalist (pro-Franco) side during the Spanish Civil War reportedly from the first day of the conflict as a member of the Falange Española de las JONS.

References

External links

1899 births
1985 deaths
Heavyweight boxers
Sportspeople from Gipuzkoa
European Boxing Union champions
Spanish male boxers
People from Urola Kosta